Carlucci is an Italian surname. Notable people with the surname include:

 Cece Carlucci (1917–2008), American baseball umpire
 Dave Carlucci (born 1963), American baseball player and coach
 David Carlucci (born 1981), American politician
 Frank Carlucci (1930–2018), American politician
 Giuseppe Carlucci (1710 ca.–1790 ca.), Italian professor and astronomer
 John Carlucci, American musician
 Milly Carlucci (born 1954), Italian television presenter, actress and singer
 William Carlucci (born 1967), American rower

See also

Carluccio (name)

Italian-language surnames
Surnames of Italian origin
Patronymic surnames
Surnames from given names